Harish Sigdel (born 4 August 1981), better known as Aaryan Sigdel, is a Nepalese film actor who has appeared in Nepali language films. He is known for his wide range of roles in the Nepali movies.

Aaryan Sigdel debuted in Kismat and then played a lead role in a romantic love story movie called Mero Euta Saathi Cha, as a young royal spoilt brat. The film was inspired by the Korean hit A Millionaire's First Love. His portrayal of Jay Shamsher Junga Bahadur Rana was highly appreciated and generated a fan-base for him, and he has seen ups and downs in his 10 year old career.

Early life
Sigdel was born in Gothikada of Surkhet district. His family moved to Thankot, Kathmandu later. He studied at Dipendra Police School and later completed his schooling from Mangloday High School Thankot. A very good student in school, Aaryan went to Birendra Sainik Awasiya Mahavidyalaya, Sallaghari, Bhaktapur and later moved to Ratna Rajya Lakshmi Campus, Kathmandu. With the desire of becoming an actor, he started taking acting lessons and could not complete his study in college. He started taking acting lessons from Pariwartan, Nepal, a theater troupe with whom Aaryan has participated in several street plays as well.

Career

Sigdel's first lead role was in Kismat, opposite Viraj Bhatta and Rekha Thapa. Kismat was a highest-grossing film of year and National award-winning film directed by Ujwal Ghimire. His second role was in Mausam, which became an average hit at the box office. In 2009, his third film Mero Euta Saathi Cha was released and met with positive response from critics and audience. It was the film that made Aaryan Sigdel a household name in Nepal. Later in the year 2010 he made a hat-trick by biggest hits Hifajat opposite Rekha Thapa, multistarrer First Love, The Flash Back: Farkera Herda opposite superstar Nikhil Upreti and Yuna Uprety.

In 2010 his six films were released. Two of his films Kohi Mero and Bandhi did not do well, where as the sixth release Kasle Choryo Mero Man opposite Rekha Thapa broke all the records at the box office and became one of the huge hits in Nepali cinema. Though the rumours of fallout between the pair is heard quite often but their pair is said to be the best onscreen pair in Nepali films compared to that of Rajesh Hamal and Karishma Manandar and Nikhil Uprety and Arunima Lamsal.

Most of his films have English titles. Many times he has been criticized for being over selective about scripts in a small industry like Nepal.

Regarded as the highest-paid actor in Nepali film industry, his film K Yo Maya Ho successfully made a good opening at the box office. K Yo Maya Ho is directed by Sudarshan Thapa, who also directed Mero Euta Saathi Cha.
Aaryan has again joined his debut producer Chhabi Raj Ojha in the movie Loafar, which was a failure. His movie Dabaab hit cinemas in 2013. Aaryan's next movie was romantic drama, November Rain, which was helmed by his I Am Sorry director Dinesh Raut, it became a huge success critically and commercially reviving his career after series of flops.

Filmography

Award

1) National Award for best Actor(Mausam)
		 	
2) National Award for best Actor (Mero Euta Saathi Chha)
 
3) Best Actor Award, D Cine Award (Kohi Mero)	

4) Best Actor Award, NEFTA Award (Kasle Choryo Mero Man)

References

External links

 https://web.archive.org/web/20120803012407/http://www.lexlimbu.com/2010/03/who-is-aryan-sigdel.html
 Biography of Aryan Sigdel
 Filmography of Aaryan Sigdel

1981 births
Living people
21st-century Nepalese male actors
People from Surkhet District
Ratna Rajya Laxmi Campus alumni
Khas people